Mykyta Kozytskyi (born 26 January 2002) is a professional Ukrainian football midfielder who plays for FC Mariupol in the Ukrainian Premier League.

Career
Born in Sverdlovsk, Kozytskyi began his playing career in the local youth sportive school #2 and continued in the DVUFK Dnipro and Azovstal Mariupol youth sportive school systems.

He made his debut for FC Mariupol in the Ukrainian Premier League as a second half-time substituted player in the losing home match against FC Shakhtar Donetsk on 10 April 2021.

References

External links
 Statistics at UAF website (Ukr)
 

2002 births
Living people
People from Sverdlovsk
Ukrainian footballers
FC Mariupol players
Ukrainian Premier League players
Association football midfielders
Sportspeople from Luhansk Oblast